The Locket (Spanish: El relicario) is a 1970 Spanish drama film directed by Rafael Gil and starring Carmen Sevilla, Arturo Fernández and Manolo Gómez Bur.

Cast
Carmen Sevilla as Virginia / Soledad  
Arturo Fernández as Alejandro  
Manolo Gómez Bur as Aquiles Lombardo 
Miguel Mateo 'Miguelín' as Luis Lucena / Manuel Lucena  
 
Francisco Piquer 
 as Taxista  
Alberto Fernández as El Gordo  
Alfredo Santacruz
Jesús Guzmán as Curro  
Rafael Hernández as Chauffeur 

Jesús Tordesillas 
Matías Prats 
Rafael Alonso as Dr. Alonso 
Tomás Blanco

References

External links

1970 drama films
Spanish drama films
Films directed by Rafael Gil
Films with screenplays by Rafael J. Salvia
1970s Spanish-language films
1970s Spanish films